is a side-scrolling action game developed by Capcom, originally released as a coin-operated arcade game in 1986, and published in North America by Romstar and Capcom. Directed by Takashi Nishiyama, the game includes beat 'em up and hack-and-slash elements. It is a spiritual successor to the beat 'em up Kung-Fu Master (1984), which was designed by Nishiyama at Irem before he left for Capcom, where he evolved its gameplay concepts with Trojan. It is also considered a spiritual successor to Capcom's Ghosts 'n Goblins (1985), which has similar side-scrolling action gameplay elements.

A Nintendo Entertainment System port was released the same year as the arcade version. It included a one-on-one fighting game mode, for the first time in a Capcom game, making it a precursor to Nishiyama's work on Capcom's Street Fighter (1987). A version for MS-DOS was also released during the same year. A ZX Spectrum version was programmed by Clive Townsend for Elite Systems in 1987 for their Durell publishing line of games, but was never released; a ROM has since been leaked from a collection of Townsend's ZX Microdrive disk files. The arcade version was later included in Capcom Classics Collection Vol. 1 for PlayStation 2 and Xbox. The NES version was rereleased in 2016 for the Wii Virtual Console, but only in Japan.

Plot
The story describes the world being under a post-apocalyptic crisis in the near future during the aftermath of a nuclear war that is devastated by a demonic influence of evil sects and terrorists. The spirits of warlords from past ages have been brought back to life, destroying civilization with disease and insanity. The bodies of the strongest survivors, the "chosen", are possessed by these violent spirits to rule the small, peaceful tribes with an iron fist. The supreme leader of this new order is known as Achilles.

The main character is a young warrior resistant to the evil spirits, who has taken the battle-name Hero Trojan; for the name sake in being hired to defeat the gang of an evil dictator whom he once worked under, but rebelled against his leader for slaughtering innocent lives. The player's mission is to infiltrate the lands of the evil army, fighting against pirates and gladiators, exorcising these human-demons from the earth in a gothic/industrial wasteworld with the help of his trusty sword, shield, and his martial arts.

Gameplay
The arcade version can be played by up to two players. The game's controls consist of an eight-way joystick and two action buttons. Similarly to Kung-Fu Master and Rush'n Attack, the player jumps by holding the joystick upwards instead of having a dedicated jump button like other side-scrolling action games. Instead, one button is used to swing the sword at enemies and the other to hold the shield to block enemy attacks, including projectiles such as throwing-knives and arrows. The shield can be held towards the player while standing or crouching, as well as upwards vertically and diagonally. Some enemies will throw magic balls which cause the player to lose their sword and shield if they block. During these instances, the player will fight barehanded, with the sword and shield buttons used to punch and kick respectively. The sword and shield will appear on-screen after some time, allowing the player to recover them. Power-ups include floating hearts that restore the player's health and jumping spots where the player can jump higher than usual.

The game consists of six stages, where the player will face the usual series of weak enemies, as well as a sub-boss at the middle of each stage and a boss at the end. The player is allowed to start the game at any of the six stages. However, the player must play through the entire game again after defeating the final boss, Achilles, in order to see the true ending (similarly to Ghosts 'n Goblins). The player can continue after a game over depending on the dip switch settings.

The NES version of Trojan features several significant changes to the game, such as the addition of new power-ups and hidden rooms, an additional boss battle on the final stage against a pair of characters known collectively as King Shriek, and an alternative versus mode, where two players compete against each other in a first-to-three-rounds match, making it Capcom's first attempt at the fighting game genre. Player 1 controls the main character, while Player 2 controls the enemy character, whose abilities are identical to the main character. While the version in Capcom Classics Collection Vol. 1 is a direct emulation of the original arcade game, it also allows the option to assign one of the action buttons for jumping in addition to using the directional pad or the analog stick.

Reception

In Japan, Game Machine listed Trojan on their June 1, 1986 issue as being the sixteenth most-successful table arcade unit of the month.

Clare Edgeley of Computer and Video Games gave the arcade game a positive review. She praised the graphics and gameplay, and considered it to be a worthy successor to Capcom's side-scrolling arcade hit Ghosts 'n Goblins (1985). Allgame editor Brett Alan Weiss praised the game, commenting "though not as good or as influential as Ghosts & Goblins or the Mega Man series, Capcom's lesser known Trojan is still a fine game with a nice variety of levels to traverse and an interesting mix of enemies to battle".

References

1986 video games
Arcade video games
Capcom games
DOS games
Hack and slash games
PlayChoice-10 games
PlayStation 3 games
PlayStation Network games
Romstar games
Nintendo Entertainment System games
Nintendo Vs. Series games
Post-apocalyptic video games
Video games about nuclear war and weapons
Video games based on Greek mythology
Video games developed in Japan
Xbox 360 Live Arcade games